Faisal Bangal (born 5 January 1996) is a Mozambican footballer.

Club career
In 2006, Bangal joined the Atalanta B.C. youth system. In 2014, he signed a contract with Atalanta B.C. until 2017.

On 1 August 2014, he was loaned to Lega Pro club Ascoli for six months. He made his professional league debut against Pistoiese on 31 August 2014. He returned to Atalanta B.C. on 31 December 2014, but he was immediately loaned to San Marino Calcio in Lega Pro until end of season. On 31 August 2015, he was loaned to Tuttocuolo in Lega Pro.

International career
In March 2014, he was called up for Mozambique national football team for a friendly match against Angola. On 5 March 2014 he made his Mozambique national football team debut against Angola national football team in Maputo.

Career statistics

Club

International

References

External links
 

1995 births
Living people
Association football forwards
Mozambican footballers
Mozambican expatriate footballers
Mozambique international footballers
Serie C players
Ascoli Calcio 1898 F.C. players
A.S.D. Victor San Marino players
A.C. Tuttocuoio 1957 San_Miniato players
Expatriate footballers in Italy
People from Manica Province
Mozambican Muslims